The 1946 Delaware Fightin' Blue Hens football team was an American football team that represented the University of Delaware as a member of the Mason–Dixon Conference during the 1946 college football season. In their fourth year under head coach William D. Murray, the Blue Hens compiled a perfect 10–0 record, won the Maxon-Dixon Conference championship, defeated  in the Cigar Bowl, and were selected by the Associated Press as the small college national champion. 

Delaware ranked fifth nationally among small-college teams in total offense with an average of 335.1 yards per game. It ranked 14th nationally in total defense, giving up an average of 163.4 yards per game.

The team played the majority of its home games at Wilmington Park. The October 26 game against Drexel was the final game played at Frazer Field, and the last game played in Newark until the opening of Delaware Stadium in 1952.

Schedule

After the season

The 1947 NFL Draft was held on December 16, 1946. The following Fightin' Blue Hens were selected.

References

Delaware
Delaware Fightin' Blue Hens football seasons
College football national champions
Cigar Bowl champion seasons
College football undefeated seasons
Delaware Fightin' Blue Hens football